Mohammad Yakub Ali Chowdhury (2 November 1888 – 15 December 1940) was a Bengali essayist and journalist. He was noted as one of the few Bengali Muslim literary scholars of his time.

Early life
Chowdhury was born on 2 November 1888 in the village of Maguradangi in Pangsha into the aristocratic Bengali Muslim Chowdhury family of Greater Faridpur. His father was Enayetullah Chowdhury, a policeman by profession. His elder brother was Rowshan Ali Chowdhury, a politician and journalist, and his younger brother was Awlad Ali Chowdhury, also a journalist. After completing his primary education at Pangsha Middle English School, he then enrolled at the Raja Surya Kumar Institution in Rajbari where he passed his entrance exam. He then moved onto studying at the Presidency College, Kolkata for four years before his studies came to an end due to eye problems.

Career
Chowdhury started teaching at the Zorwarganj English High School in Mirsharai Thana in 1914. The following year, he worked as the assistant teacher at the Raja Surya Kumar Institute. He taught at George High School in Pangsha in 1918. He was involved with the Indian National Congress and was imprisoned from 1920 to 1921 for his active involvement in the Khilafat Movement (being the ringleader for the Pangsha area) and Non-cooperation movement, resulting in him losing his career as teacher.

Chowdhury then moved to Kolkata, joining his younger brother Awlad. He served as a founding member and later Secretary of the Bangiya Mussalman Sahitya Samiti. He edited the association's magazine with Golam Mostofa from January 1927. He also contributed to The Kohinoor which was edited by his brother, Rowshan. Most of Yakub Ali Chowdhury's essays were based on Islam, its teachings and philosophy, as well as Islamic culture and Hindu–Muslim unity. He was also noted to have been a strong advocate of Bengali as the language of Bengali Muslims as opposed to Urdu, during the nationwide controversy between the 1920s to 1930s.

Death and legacy
Suffering from severe financial hardship and tuberculosis, he spent his last days in his home village and died on 15 December 1940. Writer Abdul Quadir compiled his essays into a single work titled Yāqub Alī Chaudhurī Rachanābalī in 1963. Chowdhury's works were also included in Kazi Abdul Wadud's Shashwata Banga. In 1985, an institution in Pangsha was founded named Yakub Ali Chowdhuri Bidyapith. His literary works were included in the curriculum of school level, secondary, higher secondary and graduation level Bengali literature in Bangladesh.

Essay collections
Bāngālī Musalmāner Bhāshā O Shāhitya The Kohinoor (Jan/Feb 1914)
Dharmer Kāhinī (1914) [Religious instruction for Muslims]
Nūrnabī (1918) [Book on the life of Muhammad for children]
Shāntidhārā (1918) [Essay on the glory of Islam]
Mānab Mukuṭ (1926) [Book on the life of Muhammad's life and teachings]

References

Further reading
Golpo Songroho (Collected Stories), the national textbook of B.A. (pass and subsidiary) course of Bangladesh, published by University of Dhaka in 1979 (reprint in 1986).
Bangla Sahitya (Bengali Literature), the national textbook of intermediate (college) level of Bangladesh published in 1996 by all educational boards.

1888 births
Bengali Muslims
20th-century Bengalis
Bengali male poets
20th-century Bengali poets
1940 deaths
People from Rajbari District
Bengali writers
Bengali-language writers
People from Faridpur District